Ralph James Balkcom (March 31, 1921 – April 21, 2006) was an American politician. He served as a Democratic member for the 140th district of the Georgia House of Representatives.

Life and career
Balkcom was born in Early County, Georgia, the son of Ethel Green and James Balkcom. He attended Abraham Baldwin Agricultural College and served in the United States Army Air Forces from 1945 to 1946 and became a staff sergeant. He was a farmer.

In 1977, Balkcom was elected to represent the 140th district of the Georgia House of Representatives, succeeding William Mobley Howell. He served until the 1990s.

Balkcom died in April 2006, at the age of 85.

References

1921 births
2006 deaths
20th-century American politicians
Farmers from Georgia (U.S. state)
People from Early County, Georgia
Democratic Party members of the Georgia House of Representatives
United States Army Air Forces non-commissioned officers